Elliptical may mean:
 having the shape of an ellipse, or more broadly, any oval shape
 in botany, having an elliptic leaf shape
 of aircraft wings, having an elliptical planform
 characterised by ellipsis (the omission of words), or by concision more broadly
 an elliptical trainer, an exercise machine

See also 
 Ellipse (disambiguation)
 Ellipsis (disambiguation)